Brooks Secondary School is a high school in Powell River, British Columbia part of School District 47 Powell River. Recent expansion to the school added a 100 by 50 meter turf field. Brooks is also home to the Max Cameron Theatre, a 500-seat two level proscenium theatre.

History 
Brooks Secondary was rebuilt on the same site as the original Brooks school.  The new Brooks saw its first graduating class in 1996. In the early 2000s, Max Cameron Secondary School, the other high school in Powell River, was closed and Brooks Secondary became the sole high school in town.

Fine Arts 
The school is home to numerous musical groups, including their concert bands (junior and senior), senior jazz band, chamber choir, and senior vocal jazz ensemble. Their drama program has performed annual productions of numerous plays and musicals, such as Grease, Romeo and Juliet, and A Midsummer Night's Dream.

Sports 
The school fields teams for various sports, including boys' and girls' volleyball, soccer, and basketball. Their sports teams also include golf, rugby, and tennis.

References

High schools in British Columbia
Powell River, British Columbia
Educational institutions in Canada with year of establishment missing